is a Japanese manga artist and graphic novelist. He was born in Aichi, Japan.

He is best known for the Pokémon manga The Electric Tale of Pikachu published by Viz Media (known as Dengeki Pikachu and published by Shogakukan in Japan). He also illustrated the first two volumes of the manga adaption of the Crest of the Stars trilogy, and draws hentai under the pen name of Kamirenjaku Sanpei.

References

External links 
 Dogasu's Backpack, An interview with Toshihiro Ono
 
 The Doujinshi DB Project, "Kamirenjaku Sanpei / 上連雀三平", works list

1965 births
Hentai creators
Japanese graphic novelists
Living people
Manga artists